Louis Fenn Bisdee (22 September 1910 – 16 November 2010) was an Australian politician.

Career
He was born in Tasmania. In 1959 he was elected to the Tasmanian Legislative Council as the independent member for Monmouth. He served until he was defeated in 1981. Bisdee died in Hobart in 2010 at the age of 100.

References

1910 births
2010 deaths
Independent members of the Parliament of Tasmania
Members of the Tasmanian Legislative Council
Australian centenarians
Men centenarians